One on One was a concert tour by English musician Paul McCartney that began on 13 April 2016 and traveled through the United States, Canada, Argentina, Germany, France, Spain, the Netherlands, the Czech Republic, Norway, Denmark, Belgium, Japan, Brazil, Mexico, Australia and New Zealand, ending on 16 December 2017. The tour marked McCartney's first-ever performances in Fresno, South Dakota, and Arkansas. Prior to the announcement of the tour, McCartney revealed two European festival dates for June 2016 at the Pinkpop Festival and Rock Werchter respectively.

McCartney described the title of the tour as "when I do the show, I feel like I'm kind of talking to someone like me in the audience, even though you're at the back of the hall, we try and bring the intimacy to you. It's me, one-on-one, with every member of the audience". As with his other concert tours as a solo artist, the tour's setlist was composed of songs by his former bands the Beatles and Wings, as well as songs from his solo career.

Background
On 15 February 2016, McCartney announced two initial festival dates in Europe for the upcoming summer. These two headlining performances at Pinkpop Festival in Landgraaf, Netherlands and Rock Werchter in Werchter, Belgium were revealed before the initial revelation of the "One on One" tour. These tours would feature mostly similar elements of the "One on One" performances yet with a condensed set list to allot for festival curfew limits and less stage elements given restrictions. In the wake of the passing of notable Beatles and McCartney producer George Martin, McCartney announced the initial "One on One" dates for North America and Europe. In North America, McCartney's visit to Fresno, California would mark his first performance in the city, and his performances in North Little Rock and Sioux Falls would be his first performances in the states of Arkansas and South Dakota respectively. Elsewhere in North America, McCartney would perform in Portland after an eleven-year absence following his 2005 'US' tour. The two shows in Vancouver would follow his previous performance in the city at the BC Place stadium in 2012, yet this tour would feature two shows in the neighboring Rogers Arena after the pyrotechnics during his concert at BC Place accidentally damaged the stadium's new roof. McCartney's Seattle show would mark his shortest absence from any North American city on the tour announced currently, as he performed at the city's Safeco Field during the inaugural year of the 'Out There' tour. McCartney announced a performance on 16 March in Minneapolis at the Target Center. This show would take place on 4 May 2016, less than two years after McCartney's last performance in the city at the adjacent baseball stadium sharing a corporate sponsor with the arena, Target Field. Due to high demand of tickets a second show in Minneapolis was announced the next day and would take place on 5 May.

In Europe, McCartney's Düsseldorf concert would be his first in the city since 1972 with his post-Beatles band Wings. The Munich performance would follow a 13-year break from the city, lastly hosting a performance in 2003 during the Back in the World tour. McCartney would visit the Waldbühne amphitheater in Berlin for his first Berlin performance since his Good Evening Europe Tour in 2009. On 14 March 2016, a performance was announced for the city of Madrid to take place on 2 June 2016. This performance at the Estadio Vicente Calderón would mark McCartney's almost twelve years to the date of his last Madrid performance. Each of these European performances, including festivals, would be McCartney's first performance at each specific venue in these cities. In addition to these venues, McCartney would return to Paris less than a year following his performance at the city's Stade de France. Announced on 16 March, his performance would take place on 30 May 2016 at the AccorHotels Arena. McCartney last performed at the venue during his 2011 On the Run tour. McCartney announced on 29 March a performance in the city of Prague to take place at the O2 Arena on 16 June 2016. This would be his first performance in the Czech Republic since 2004.

The tour marks McCartney's first-ever performance as a solo artist of "A Hard Day's Night" and the first time the song was performed by a Beatle in half a century since the Beatles played it for the last time on 31 August 1965 at the Cow Palace in Daly City, California.

On 30 May 2016 at the AccorHotels Arena in Paris, France, Paul McCartney performed "Michelle" in between "FourFiveSeconds" and "Eleanor Rigby".

On 17 July 2016, Paul played "Helter Skelter" at Fenway Park in Boston as the third song in the encore after "Hi, Hi, Hi" and before "Birthday" and Bob Weir of The Grateful Dead played rhythm guitar and New England Patriots tight end Rob Gronkowski danced on stage to the song. On 19 July 2016, McCartney performed his first ever show in Hershey, Pennsylvania at Hersheypark Stadium. The town of Hershey declared the date Paul McCartney Day and renamed street signs and rides in Hersheypark in his honor. On 21 July 2016 in Hamilton, Ontario, Canada and on 20 April 2016 in Vancouver, British Columbia, Canada, "Mull of Kintyre" was performed as the third song in the encore after "Hi, Hi, Hi". At the latter concert, Jimmy Fallon joined Paul on stage to sing "I Saw Her Standing There" after "Mull of Kintyre". The second Washington, D.C. concert from August 10, held at the Verizon Center, saw a slightly modified set-list, wherein "Letting Go" was replaced with "Jet", and in the encore, they were played as one continuous act, "Hi, Hi, Hi" was replaced by "I Saw Her Standing There." On October 8, for the first Desert Trip show, Paul made numerous set changes. First, "Save Us" was swapped with "Jet", "Temporary Secretary" was replaced by "Day Tripper", "Here, There, and Everywhere" was not played, "You Won't See Me" was swapped with "I've Just Seen A Face", "A Day in the Life", "Give Peace A Chance", and for the first time ever live, "Why Don't We Do It In The Road?" were played with Neil Young for the latter three. In the encore "I Wanna Be Your Man" replaced "Hi, Hi, Hi", and "Helter Skelter" replaced "Birthday." For the following weekend, the set was the same, except for "I Wanna Be Your Man" being swapped for "Birthday", and "Can't Buy Me Love" being replaced by "Got to Get You Into My Life." Rihanna joined the band for "FourFiveSeconds." This was the last show of the year.

The tour resumed in April 2017 with the Japan shows, revisiting the Budokan like in 2015. Before and after, Paul announced another 2 US legs; a Latin American leg, returning to Brazil after 3 years and Mexico after a  years absence; and the first visit to Australia and New Zealand in 24 years, having last visited those countries in 1993 on the New World Tour. This year has seen a couple of changes in the set list, which are "Save Us" and "Letting Go" switching with "Junior's Farm" and "Jet" respectively concert after concert, "Here, There, and Everywhere" dropped out, and "I Wanna Be Your Man" and "Sgt. Pepper's (reprise)" added, with the former added after being successfully performed at the Desert Trip, and the latter reappearing since the Up and Coming Tour, 6 years after the last performance on the last show of that tour in Las Vegas, but now, though it's been inserted in the encore like before, it's not the culminating number of the show and is not attached in a medley with The End.

Since the Newark concerts, there's another change in the set list: "The Fool on the Hill" is gone, and "A Day in the Life/Give Peace a Chance" replaces it, returning since the Desert Trip shows, and after being absent since On the Run.

Tour band

Tour dates

Notes

Cancelled shows

24 October 2017 – Medellín – Colombia – Atanasio Girardot Stadium

Set list

Typical set list

 "A Hard Day's Night"
 "Save Us" or "Junior's Farm"
 "Can't Buy Me Love"
 "Letting Go" or "Jet"
 "Temporary Secretary" or "All My Loving" or "Drive My Car"
 "Let Me Roll It"
 "I've Got a Feeling"
 "My Valentine"
 "Nineteen Hundred and Eighty-Five"
 "Here, There and Everywhere" (only in 2016)
 "Maybe I'm Amazed"
 "We Can Work It Out" or "I've Just Seen a Face"
 "In Spite of All the Danger"
 "You Won't See Me"
 "Love Me Do" 
 "And I Love Her"
 "Blackbird"
 "Here Today"
 "Queenie Eye"
 "New"
 "The Fool on the Hill" (until the Tinley Park shows)
 "Lady Madonna"
 "FourFiveSeconds"
 "Eleanor Rigby"
 "I Wanna Be Your Man" (only in 2017)
 "Being for the Benefit of Mr. Kite!"
 "Something"
 "A Day in the Life"/"Give Peace a Chance" (since the Newark shows)
 "Ob-La-Di, Ob-La-Da"
 "Band on the Run"
 "Back in the U.S.S.R."
 "Let It Be"
 "Live and Let Die"
 "Hey Jude"
Encore
 "Yesterday"
 "Sgt. Pepper's Lonely Hearts Club Band (Reprise)" (only in 2017)
 "Hi, Hi, Hi" or "Get Back", or "Mull of Kintyre" (only in Australia and New Zealand)
 "Birthday" or "I Saw Her Standing There" or "Helter Skelter"
 "Golden Slumbers"/"Carry That Weight"/"The End"

Other set lists

See also 
 List of Paul McCartney concert tours
 List of highest-grossing concert tours

References 

2016 concert tours
2017 concert tours
Paul McCartney concert tours